The ProjeKcts is a 1999 box set of four live albums recorded between 1997 and 1999 by four side projects of the band King Crimson, known as ProjeKcts.

Overview

From 1997 to 1999, King Crimson "fraKctalised" (forked) into four successive side projects, dubbed ProjeKct One, Two, Three and Four. The box set consists of a live album from each of them.

Track listing

References

External links
 User comments of The ProjeKcts at Elephant-Talk

ProjeKcts
1999 compilation albums
King Crimson compilation albums